Damodar Gautam Sawang is the chairman of Andhra Pradesh Public Service Commission and a former Director General of Police, Andhra Pradesh.

Sawang served as the Director General of Police, Andhra Pradesh from 31 May 2019 to 15 February 2022.

Sawang is a Regular Recruit of the Indian Police Service belonging to the 1986 batch and allocated to the Andhra Pradesh Police cadre.  After the bifurcation of Andhra Pradesh, Sawang was retained in the residual Andhra Pradesh State.

Many police officers have been groomed by Sawang during his posting in Warangal, including Stephen Raveendra.

References 

1963 births
Living people
Indian police chiefs
People from Vijayawada
Telugu people
Indian Police Service officers
Place of birth missing (living people)
Andhra Pradesh Police